The Musheerabad MasjidOr MASJID E KALAN, (also known as Musheerabad Badi Masjid, or Jama Masjid Musheerabad) is a mosque located in the Musheerabad locality of Hyderabad, India. The original portion was constructed in 1560 AD by Ibrahim Quli Qutb Shah, the fourth Sultan of the Qutb Shahi dynasty and is identical to the Hayat Bakshi Mosque located in Hayathnagar area of Hyderabad.

History 
After the fall of Golconda, the mosque went into disuse and remained abandoned till the area became a jagir of Nawab Arastu Jah, the Prime Minister during the reign of Nizam Ali Khan. It was also repaired in 1951. Today, the old structure is in a dilapidated state.

A new four-storied portion has been constructed to accommodate the namazis. There used to be a large courtyard where the new portion stands today.

Architecture 
The mosque has five lofty arches and two minarets at the corners.

See also
Spanish Mosque

References 

Mosques in Hyderabad, India
Musheerabad